Vehbi is a Turkish name derived from the Arabic name Wahab. It may refer to:

 Vehbi Akdağ, Turkish wrestler
 Myfti Vehbi Dibra, one of the signatories of Albanian Declaration of Independence
 Vehbi Koç, Turkish businessman

See also
 Vehbi Koç Foundation

Turkish masculine given names